Justin Thomas "JT" Daly (born January 2, 1981) is an American musician, producer, songwriter, and visual artist, known also as the frontman for Nashville-based rock band Paper Route. His recent production and co-writing work include Pvris's newest single "Hallucinations", which Billboard named the No. 1 alternative and rock song of 2019, and K. Flay's album Every Where Is Some Where, including hit single "Blood in the Cut", for which Daly received Grammy nominations for Best Rock Song and Best Engineered Album. 

In 2019, Daly composed the original score for the 30 for 30 film "Chuck & Tito", which premiered on ESPN. Daly has also released a solo record LP titled Memory and a single "The Blackest Bird" under the moniker JT Daly & The Blood Orchestra.

Early life 
Justin Thomas Daly was born in Ohio on January 2, 1981, the son of father, Thomas John Daly, and mother, Connie Lee Daly (née, Reed), where he was raised with his two younger twin brothers, Seth David Daly, and Jordan Christopher Daly.

Daly was raised in a deeply religious family in the farming communities of Wellington, Ohio and Oberlin, Ohio. He has been quoted as saying that his artistic personality made him a misfit. "I want something that I believe in and I almost want to be frightened by what I'm doing. If I'm not frightened, I don't know if it's even good enough or worth it. I could go back and work at the gas station or farm in Ohio. That would be an easier thing to do."

Career 

Daly's career as a musician began in 2000 when he joined indie rock band, For All the Drifters, while double majoring in Music Composition and Art at Greenville College. The band relocated to Nashville in 2001 and released three EPs including: For All the Drifters (2001), We Can Make Mistakes EP (2003), and Drifter EP (2004). The group disbanded in 2004 and Paper Route was formed two years later.

Visual arts 

Following the dissolution of For All the Drifters, Daly began working as a painter and graphic design artist. He was employed at Teleprompt Records from 2004–2006, where he designed artwork for several bands including Mutemath. Daly also worked as a visual artist for several musicians including Paramore, Sufjan Stevens and Black Rebel Motorcycle Club.

In 2006, Daly began work on a multimedia project called SS Mechanics (sight and sound) alongside Daniel James, best known for indie/electronic/folktronica band Canon Blue. SS Mechanics built an installation for poet/radical, Bradley Hathaway, and released a print only version of the SS Handbook. The book contains paintings and poetry by Daly and James.
Later that year, Daly worked as creator, director, and producer of the short film/music video for Edison Glass's "This House". The clip was showcased at various film festivals including The Chicago International Film Festival, The Nashville Film Festival, and The Imagination Film Festival and went on to be nominated for a Dove Award (Short Form Music Video of the Year) in 2007.

Paper Route (2006–present) 

In 2006, Daly's college friend and former member of For All the Drifters, Chad Howat, asked Daly to contribute vocals to several tracks that he had produced. They recruited another former bandmate, Andy Smith, to form the band now known as Paper Route. In August 2006, the band released a self-titled EP, followed by the A Thrill of Hope EP in December of the same year.

Paper Route toured for the large part of 2007, garnering interest from several major labels. They went on to sign with Universal Motown in December 2008 following the release of All We Are, the band's third EP. The band's major label full-length debut, Absence, was released in April 2009 and reached No. 13 on the Billboard Heatseekers chart.
The band elected to independently release their second full-length record, The Peace of Wild Things, on September 11, 2012 after Universal Motown went under. The album reached No. 8 on the Billboard Heatseekers chart. Paper Route released their third full-length album, Real Emotion, on September 23, 2016, which also charted on Heatseekers, reaching No. 12. Daly serves as Paper Route's art designer and shares recording, writing, and mixing duties with his bandmates.

The Voodoo Children (2018–present) 
The indie psych-rock group consisting of Daly and Nikki Barber was established in 2018. Their first single release is "Tangerines & Daffodils," the video for which is notable for its use of over 1,100 hand-drawn images.

Side projects (2010–present) 

Daly and his Paper Route bandmate Chad Howat contributed an instrumental track "The Music" to 2009's motion picture 500 Days of Summer. In 2012, JT released his debut solo album, Memory, a collection of unreleased tracks written for the Peace of Wild Things album. Stereo Subversion describes the LP as, "Passionate and poignant, Daly's solo debut is everything Paper Route fans would expect from the front man. It's a mature, honest release that whets the palette for more." Daly recorded the unreleased Christmas anthem, "Silver Bells," with Brandi Cyrus in 2012. Cyrus says the duo hit it off right away, "Well I started out as a huge Paper Route fan and got linked up with J.T. in the hopes of working on music together. Our mutual friend Taylor York from Paramore connected us, and we became fast friends!" He was also featured on the Camp America track, "Leader of the Pack."

Daly produced and co-wrote tracks on K.Flay's Crush Me EP including the alt rock hit, "Blood in the Cut," which Billboard described as the "exact kind of smash that rock has been missing the past few years." Daly assisted in writing and producing K.Flay's album, Every Where Is Some Where, which was released on April 4, 2017. He co-wrote and produced the tracks "Blood in the Cut", "Champagne", "Hollywood Forever", "You Felt Right" and "Slow March". His work on the album landed him two Grammy nominations. In addition, he went on to write and produce three songs off of K.Flay's third album, Solutions, "I Like Myself (Most of the Time)", "Nervous", and "Ice Cream", and two songs off of her fourth album, Inside Voices / Outside Voices, "TGIF (feat. Tom Morello)" and "My Name Isn't Katherine".

He also co-wrote and produced several tracks on Sarah Macintosh's 2011 album, Current. He has remixed tracks for various artists including Mutemath, Switchfoot ("Darkest Horses" and "The Original" from Vice Re-Verses), Judah & the Lion, and Anberlin. In February 2014 Daly released The Blackest Bird under the moniker JT Daly & The Blood Orchestra.

As a visual artist Daly has created several works including: Bed Time Stories (2013), MonstersINairports (2012) (12), KIDZ (2010), The Body Is a Kingdom, The Kingdom Is Beautiful, and Architechnopoly. He also designed a line of phone cases for Griffin and tour merchandise for the band Paramore in 2010. The band's logo still features Daly's handwriting.

In 2019, Daly produced Hallucinations, the third EP from American alternative rock band Pvris.

Awards 

Grammy Awards

References 

1981 births
Living people
Record producers from Ohio
American male musicians
American artists
People from Wellington, Ohio